Corporate Shadowfiles is a supplement published by FASA in 1993 for the dystopian cyberpunk role-playing game Shadowrun.

Contents
Corporate Shadowfiles is a 140-page softcover book by Nigel Findley that details the operations of future 21st-century megacorporations, how large corporations are structured, and some basic economics.

Reception
In the December 1993 edition of Dragon (Issue #200), Rick Swan was not a fan of the book, which he said examined its subject matter "in lengthy, often excruciating detail." Swan found the tone to be stuffy and professorial, and concluded by advising gamers to give it a pass: "Business majors may enjoy sifting through 140-plus pages of this, but others probably will find it excessive."

Reviews
White Wolf #41 (March, 1994)

References

Role-playing game supplements introduced in 1993
Shadowrun supplements